John J. McNulty Jr. ("Jack" or "Big Jack") (1922–2009) was a northern New York State, U.S.A. political power broker, who held a series of local political offices in Albany County, New York from 1949 until 2002.

His son, Michael R. McNulty, was elected to several successive terms as a United States Congressman. Jack McNulty was a "co-congressman" for the two decades that his son served in the U.S. Congress, before his retirement from the U.S. House of Representatives in 2008. A fellow Democrat, Jack was a staunch opponent of the entrenched old guard Albany County Democratic political machine, which had unseated his father John J. McNulty Sr. as Sheriff of Albany County, New York in a political in-fight in 1937. Jack recaptured that sheriff's office in 1973.

McNulty was a respected elder statesman of northern New York State; the mention of his name at a 2000 Democratic convention at the Times Union Center caused the full arena crowd of 11,000 people to rise in a spontaneous standing ovation. "Jack McNulty's word was his bond," said Democratic New York State Senator Neil Breslin. "For being 87, Jack knew how to change with the time. Jack connected to people in their 20s," said Albany County Democratic Chairman Dan McCoy. Rensselaer County Democratic Chairman Thomas Wade called him "the man I often introduced at Democratic Party events as the greatest Democrat I know."

References

External links
 obituary Times Union

New York (state) Democrats
Sheriffs of Albany County, New York
20th-century American politicians
1922 births
2009 deaths